John Hancock (born 1976 as John Langley Hayward) is an Australian businessman. He is the son of Gina Rinehart and grandson of the late mining magnate Lang Hancock.

Early childhood and education 
The son of English-born Greg Milton and Australian Gina Rinehart, John Hancock was born John Langley Hayward. His younger sister is Bianca Rinehart and his two half sisters are Ginia Rinehart and Hope Welker.

Milton subsequently changed his name to Greg Hayward. John Hancock changed his surname to Hancock, a tribute to his grandfather after a dispute with his mother. Hancock was educated at the Phillips Academy in Andover, Massachusetts in the United States.

Hope Margaret Hancock Trust 
In 2010, Hancock and his sister, Hope Welker, and half-sister, Bianca Rinehart, launched action in the Supreme Court of New South Wales against their mother in relation to the operation of a family trust fund established by the late grandfather. John Hancock quoted as responding to a question about living off the family trust fund: 
“Well it'd be nice if I was, but I have all the bad things about having money and none of the good things.”
Despite his difference with his mother, he still loves her very much and have indicated they agree 90 percent of the time. It is the ten percent which causes the difficulties.

The NSW Supreme Court handed down its decision by appointing Bianca Rinehart as trustee of the Hope Margaret Hancock Trust. Their mother already agreed to step aside as trustee and wanted consultation on who should replace her.

Net worth 
Hancock appeared on the Financial Review Rich List for the first time in 2020 with a net worth assessed at 2.05 billion. Hancock appeared on the Forbes list of Australia's 50 richest people for the first time in 2017, with a net worth of 5.00 billion, held jointly with his sister, Hope Welker, and half-sisters, Bianca Rinehart, and Ginia Rinehart.

Notes 
: Forbes listed jointly with his sister, Hope Welker, and half-sisters, Bianca Rinehart, and Ginia Rinehart.

References 

1976 births
People from Perth, Western Australia
Phillips Academy alumni
Australian people of English descent
Living people
John